Angehrud (also Romanized as Āngerūd; also known as Angeh Rūd) is a village in Owzrud Rural District, Baladeh District, Nur County, Mazandaran Province, Iran. At the 2006 census, its population was 80, in 25 families.

Website 
www.angehrud.ir

SMS Number 
+9830009900090362

References 

Populated places in Nur County